The 1985 Cupa României Final was the 47th final of Romania's most prestigious football cup competition. It was disputed between Steaua București and Universitatea Craiova, and was won by Steaua București after a game with 3 goals. It was the 14th cup for Steaua București.

Route to the final

Match details

See also
List of Cupa României finals

References

External links
Romaniansoccer.ro

1985
Cupa
Romania
FC Steaua București matches